Sirivennela is a 1986 Indian Telugu-language romance film written and directed by K. Viswanath. The film stars Suhasini, Sarvadaman Banerjee and Moon Moon Sen. The film has music composed by K. V. Mahadevan.

The film won five Nandi Awards. The film was screened at the Asia Pacific Film Festival, the International Film Festival of India, the Moscow Film Festival and the AISFM Film Festival. The film was shot in Jaipur and Kerala. The film has Hariprasad Chaurasia's flute rendering and a cameo of drummer Sivamani. The film was dubbed in Tamil as Raaga Devathai. Lyricist Seetharama Sastry derived his stage name Sirivennela from this film.

Plot
Hari Prasad (Sarvadaman Banerjee), a blind flutist lives along with his younger sister in a village near Jaipur, which was also a tourist attraction. Though he lacks knowledge of classical music, he plays flute beautifully and makes a living by playing it to tourists. One day, guide Jyothirmai (Moon Moon Sen) comes there along with a bunch of tourists and listens to his flute. She understands his talent and helps him understand nature and to become a famous flutist. Years pass and Hari Prasad becomes Pandit Hari Prasad. Unknown to her, Hari Prasad admires her very much and dedicates all his albums to her. Meanwhile, a mute painter Subhashini (Suhasini) who meets him in his village, falls for him.

Subhashini expresses her feelings through her paintings and gradually her brother understands her feelings regarding Hari Prasad. He approaches Hari Prasad's uncle with a marriage proposal. But at the same time Hari Prasad reveals his admiration for Jyothirmai. This shocks Jyothirmai as she previously worked as an escort to rich tourists. She tries to hint Hari Prasad about her not so decent past, but is overwhelmed by his pure love and disregard for her external characters. Though she herself admires him, she feels that she would taint him with her impure past. She tells Hari Prasad that she couldn't marry him as she already engaged to a doctor. Hari Prasad takes it well as he always wanted Jyothirmai to be happy, and arranges her wedding.

On the wedding day, Jyothirmai commits suicide and requests in her last note that her eyes should be donated to Hari Prasad. She also requests that her funeral procession should appear like a marriage procession and her death should be hidden from Hari Prasad. Everyone tries to act normal and sends her as they are sending a bride to her in-laws. Hari Prasad keeps calm all the time and at last goes to the graveyard to say his final goodbyes to Jyothirmai. He tells shocked Subhashini that it's impossible to hide the death of his angel from him. The film ends with Hari Prasad and Subhashini mourning silently in the graveyard.

Cast
Suhasini as Subhashini 
Sarvadaman Banerjee as Pandit Hari Prasad
Moon Moon Sen as Jyotirmayi
Nithya as Hari's sister
J. V. Ramana Murthi
S. K. Misro
Shubha
Sakshi Ranga Rao
Subhalekha Sudhakar
Varalakshmi
Eashwara Rao
 Baby Meena

Soundtrack
Sirivennela abounds in classical music composed by K. V. Mahadevan with flute renditions by the renowned flautist Hariprasad Chaurasia. All songs were written by Seetharama Sastry. After the success of the soundtrack, he became popularly known as "Sirivennela" Seetharama Sastry. The music was released through Lahari music label.

Awards

|-
| rowspan="5"|Nandi Awards 1986

| Sirivennela Sitaramasastri(for "Vidatha Talapuna")
| Best Lyricist
| 
|-
| S. P. Balasubrahmanyam(for "Vidatha Talapuna")
| Best Male Playback Singer
| 
|-
| Moon Moon Sen
| Best Supporting Actress
| 
|-
| Pandurangan 
|Best Audiographer
| 
|-
| M. V. Raghu
| Special Jury Award
| 
|}

References

External links

1986 films
Films about the arts
Films about blind people in India
Films about disability in India
Films about deaf people
Disability in fiction
Films directed by K. Viswanath
Films scored by K. V. Mahadevan
Indian romantic musical films
Films about fictional painters
1980s romantic musical films
1980s Telugu-language films